The Minister of Police is a minister in the government of New Zealand with responsibility for the New Zealand Police.

The current officeholder is Ginny Andersen of the Labour Party. She has held the position since 20 March 2023.

History
Initially responsibility for the police force had rested with the Minister of Defence but was instead allocated to the Minister of Justice in 1896. The minister responsible for police was, for the most part, the holder of either aforementioned office until it was later split into a separate full ministerial portfolio in 1969.

List of Police Ministers
The following ministers have held the office of Minister of Police.

Key

Notes

References

External links
New Zealand Police

Police